Arequipa Pottery was a type of Arts and Crafts style pottery produced in Marin County, California, in the United States from 1911 until 1918.  Arequipa Pottery differs from many Arts and Crafts pottery businesses because it was produced as part of the therapy process for women recovering from tuberculosis in the San Francisco Bay Area.  The pottery was also produced from local clay.

Founder - Dr. Philip King Brown

Arequipa Pottery was established by Dr. Philip King Brown as part of the rehabilitative therapy program at a tuberculosis sanatorium located outside of Fairfax, California.   The pottery was active from 1911 through 1918.

Following the 1906 San Francisco earthquake, dust-and ash-filled air contributed to a tuberculosis epidemic in San Francisco. The incidence of the disease was much higher among women than men.

The Arequipa Sanatorium, directed by Brown, was opened to serve women in the first stages of tuberculosis.  At the time, the only known treatment was rest and good nutrition, in the hopes that the lungs could recover and heal.

Brown got his first taste of running a sanatorium when he inherited a large house left to him by a wealthy relative located in Santa Barbara, California.  The name of this facility was Miradero, established to rehabilitate "nervous cases."  At that time, treatment for tuberculosis, or TB, in a sanatorium was costly and there were few alternatives where working-class women could go to recover from this illness.  Brown was active with the San Francisco Tuberculosis Polyclinic, which was a facility where people learned about the prevention and treatment of tuberculosis.  This experience motivated Brown's desire to establish a facility which was affordable for working-class women.

The Arts and Crafts Movement

The Arts and Crafts movement flourished from 1860 - 1910.  The movement encouraged production of hand crafted goods.  The production and growth of American art pottery began in the 1870s with a group of women in Cincinnati, Ohio. The most famous pottery artists were Maria Longworth Nichols Storer  (1849-1932) and Mary Louise McLaughlin (1847-1939).  China painting was an activity considered appropriate for middle and upper-class women during this time and influenced the decision to using ceramics as the choice of craft work to be produced at Arequipa.
With the help of local artists and members of the area's philanthropic community, Brown introduced therapeutic handcrafts to the women.  The Arts and Crafts Movement believed that crafts could provide great satisfaction.  In addition, the director wanted to combat idleness, avoid the stigma of charity, and produce revenue.  The idea of ceramics as a form of occupational therapy had been pioneered by a sanatorium at Marblehead, Massachusetts in 1904.

Establishing the Sanatorium

Brown's mother was Dr. Charlotte Blake Brown, a renowned physician in the early history of San Francisco.  Dr. Brown received his medical degree from Harvard University in 1893.  Brown then returned to California, established his practice and also was a teacher. In 1900, he married Helen Hillyer, who was mentored by  Phoebe Apperson Hearst.  As a result of this mentorship, Ms. Hillyer and the Hearst family remained friends for the rest of their lives.

In 1909 Henry Bothin, a philanthropist and business magnate who obtained is wealth through real estate, learned about Brown's desire to establish an affordable sanatorium and contacted him about building a clinic on some land he owned in Fairfax, California.  In 1905 Bothin donated land in Fairfax to the Telegraph Hill Neighborhood House, a community center and clinic located in San Francisco.  The property in Fairfax, called Hill Farm, provided a place where mothers and children convalesce from their ill health.   Bothin offered a piece of land to Brown which was located below Hill Farm.  It is of interest to note that this land was once owned by Phoebe Hearst.  Brown accepted the offer from Bothin, and construction for the sanatorium began in April 1911 and officially opened on September 9, 1911.  The official name of this institution was Arequipa Sanatorium and it was designed by well-known San Francisco architect John Bakewell. The name "Arequipa" - based on the name of the homonym city of Arequipa in Peru - is from a Peruvian aboriginal language which would allegedly mean "Place of rest", though this interpretation was actually based on some popular etymology.

The Pottery

Most of the clay used by the pottery was dug locally by boys who did the heavy work.  The patients spent a limited number of hours per day finishing and decorating the pots.
Production was directed by a succession of well-known ceramists: Frederick Hurten Rhead, Albert Solon, and Fred Wilde, who were responsible for the shapes of the ware, thus resulting in dramatic variations in style.  The patients added surface decorations, either in the form of designs painted on the surface or patterns carved into the damp clay.

Rhead, who headed the pottery from 1911 until 1913, trained as a potter in England.  Prior to moving to California, he had worked for Edward Gardner Lewis at University City, Missouri where his activities included running a pottery correspondence course. Rhead introduced slip trailing, a technique which became the signature form of decoration of Arequipa pottery. The most common design under Rhead's tenure was a band of stylized ivy leaves.
While Rhead's artistic talent was not in doubt, the management of the sanatorium were not happy with his approach to the pottery as a business.
In July 1913 Rhead was replaced as director of the pottery by Albert Solon, who implemented cuts in running costs.  Solon, like Rhead, was born in Staffordshire, England.  Solon's brother Camille came to join him the following year.
In 1915, at the Panama–Pacific International Exposition in San Francisco, the Arequipa Tuberculosis Sanatorium exhibited its ceramic works in the fair's Palace of Education, where discharged patients demonstrated pottery-making and sold examples of the product.  The Arequipa pottery ceased operation in 1918.

As TB came under the control of antibiotic treatment, the sanatorium was converted to a hospital. Standards of care kept changing, and there was little need for it.  
After being closed in 1957, the hospital and sanatorium facility were offered for use as a Girl Scout camp in 1960.  Eventually the property was donated to the local council, which raised funds for new facilities, such as a swimming pool.  Other changes have been made so the property serves current needs.

The Oakland Museum of California has the largest existing holding of pottery and tiles from Arequipa, with more than 100 pieces in its collections.  The products of the Arequipa Pottery have become highly prized among collectors.

References

American art pottery
Arts and Crafts movement
Marin County, California
Art in the San Francisco Bay Area